Le Cheminant Watch Company is a brand that dates back to the first half of the 19th century. Originally a jeweller, it has since become principally a watch maker and, in the early 20th century, supplied chronometers and deck watches to the Royal Navy. Since the 1950s it has concentrated on watches and is currently based in Surrey, England.

Company history
The known references for Le Cheminant begin in February 1847, when Mr. Le Cheminant, a jeweller, has a shop at 72 Wimpole Street, London. The British Museum has a rare watch paper which places him at the virtually identical address of 72A, Wimpole Street. Although John Le Cheminant, "watchmaker and jeweller" died on 1 February 1876, the name continued, with Le Cheminant appearing in trade directories as 'watch maker' at the same address, 72a Wimpole Street, in 1884. By 1915 Le Cheminant has an address at 81 Wigmore Street, in the same London district, and was inscribing this address on its timepieces.

At this time Le Cheminant was among several companies which supplied precision timepieces to the British Royal Navy. The Royal Navy also purchased deck watches from Le Cheminant – a batch of six in December 1915, costing between £5 5/- and £5 15/-, and another batch of six in December 1915, costing between £6 5/- and £6 15/-. Most of these were retired from service in the 1930s.

By 1923 Le Cheminant had become Le Cheminant and Co, at 97 Wigmore Street on the corner of Duke Street. Classified ads appeared frequently with this address in The Times until December 1933, offering the reassuring information in 1927 that they had been established 100 years and, in 1929, that Le Cheminant had been established in 1822, significant because this date became a strong feature of the brand in later years.

By September 1957 Le Cheminant was bought by Suffolk-based retail watchmakers and jewellers, the Betts family. Antony, Stuart and Gordon Betts were brothers and directors of Betts (Ipswich) Ltd. The main branch of Le Cheminant, however, was at 106 Wigmore Street, and the 1967 catalogue lists branches in Norwich (17 Castle Street), Leicester (1 Odeon Arcade, Market Place) and Bristol (81, The Horsefair).

Among the Le Cheminant models at this time were ladies' watches with a variety of gold bracelets, children's watches, pendant and nurses' watch. All incorporated the Incabloc shock protection system. The Master Mariner series was one of their best-known lines and some models bore a close resemblance to high-end models on the market, such as the Precision Astrochon by Ollech & Wajs and chronographs by Rotary Watches.

On the retirement of the Betts family, the company was taken over by Peter Reade, who ran it in Ipswich until 2007, when it was purchased by the present owner, Stephen Grostate.

Royal Naval vessel pieces

Distribution and repairs
New Le Cheminant designs are only available from the brand owner, Stephen Grostate, who also repairs existing models.

References

Watch brands